The Famines are a Canadian indie rock band formed in 2008 in Edmonton, Alberta. The two piece band uses a modern and minimalistic approach that draws comparison to mid 1970s protopunk and fuzzy garage rock. The band name is meant to be a commentary on the continued feeling of emptiness and lacking in a society that is materially fulfilled. The band has two members, R. E. Biesinger on guitar and vocals, and Drew Demers on the drums.

In 2020, The Famines announced that they had become a music publishing company called Pentagon Black.

See also

Music of Canada
Canadian rock
List of Canadian musicians
List of bands from Canada
:Category:Canadian musical groups

References

External links
 http://www.thefamines.ca - Official website
 http://profile.myspace.com/thefamines - Band Myspace Page
 http://gauntlet.ucalgary.ca/story/12785 - album review, The Gauntlet
 http://seemagazine.com/article/music/music-review/cds-famines-plus-nerd-hold-steady-and-bob-sinclar/ - album review, See Magazine
 http://www.vueweekly.com/article.php?id=9004 – release review, Vue Weekly

Musical groups established in 2008
Canadian indie rock groups
Canadian indie pop groups
Musical groups from Edmonton
2008 establishments in Alberta